de Soto is a Spanish surname. Notable people with the surname include:

Alexander de Soto (1840–1936), Spanish American physician, businessman, and philanthropist
Álvaro de Soto (born 1943), Peruvian diplomat and UN special envoy
Domingo de Soto (1494–1560), Spanish theologian
Ernest de Soto (1923 – 2014), American master printmaker and lithographer.
Francisco de Soto (c. 1500–1563), Spanish organist and composer
Hernando de Soto (c. 1496/1497–1542), Spanish conquistador
Hernando de Soto Polar (born 1941), Peruvian economist and author
Jesús Huerta de Soto (born 1956), economist of the Austrian school, born in Spain
Luis Barahona de Soto (1548–1595), Spanish poet
Pedro de Soto (1493–1563), Spanish theologian
Benito de Soto (1805–1830), pirate
Ernestine Ygnacio-De Soto, sometimes written as Ernestine Ygnacio De Soto, Barbareño Chumash activist and historian.

Spanish-language surnames